The Samuel F. Nixon Homestead', or simply the Nixon Homestead, is a historic home located in the Village of Westfield in Chautauqua County, New York. The original house was built in 1856 and subsequently expanded in about 1890 to its current size and style.

A two-storey wood frame Queen Anne and Colonial Revival style dwelling, it features a prominent Palladian window. The home's namesake was S. Frederick Nixon (1860–1905) who represented Chautauqua County in the New York State Assembly and served as Speaker of the Assembly from 1899 to 1905.

It was listed on the National Register of Historic Places in 1983.

References

Houses on the National Register of Historic Places in New York (state)
Queen Anne architecture in New York (state)
Colonial Revival architecture in New York (state)
Houses completed in 1856
Houses in Chautauqua County, New York
National Register of Historic Places in Chautauqua County, New York